The 23rd Golden Disc Awards were held on December 10, 2008. They recognized accomplishments by musicians from the previous year.

Presenters 
 Kim So-yeon
 Lee So-yeon
 So Yi-hyun
 Song Dae-kwan
 Jeong Si-ah
 Jin Bo-ra
 Kim Seong-eun
 Moon Chae-won
 Park Ye-jin
 Go Ara
 Seo Woo

Winners and nominees

Main awards 
Winners and nominees are listed in alphabetical order. Winners are listed first and emphasized in bold.

Other awards 

 New Trend Award: Kim Jong-wook
 Lifetime Achievement Award: Kim Chang-wan
 Record Producer of the Year: Lee Soo-man

Gallery 
Award ceremony gallery

References

External links 
 

23
2008 music awards
2008 in South Korean music